The 1918 Waterford City by-election was held on 22 March 1918.

The by-election was held due to the death of the incumbent Irish Parliamentary MP, John Redmond.  The Irish Parliamentary candidate William Redmond, his son, defeated Vincent White, the Sinn Féin candidate, by 1,242 votes to 764. Redmond had resigned his seat in East Tyrone to contest the seat.

Famously Redmond campaigned in his army uniform and wearing a black armband. His victory was the second defeat of Sinn Féin at by-elections and gave a big, albeit temporary, boost to the morale of supporters of the Irish Parliamentary Party. Although he retained his seat in the general election of December that year, he did not take part in the First Dáil.

References

1918 elections in the United Kingdom
By-elections to the Parliament of the United Kingdom in County Waterford constituencies
Politics of Waterford (city)
1918 elections in Ireland